Dorothy Steel (February 23, 1926 – October 15, 2021) was an American actress. Having started her career at the age of 88, she played minor characters in several high-profile films including Black Panther, Poms, Jumanji: The Next Level, and her final film, Black Panther: Wakanda Forever.

Born in Detroit, Michigan, in 1926, she lived in Atlanta, Georgia for many years. She worked for many years as a senior revenue officer for the Internal Revenue Service, retiring from the service on December 7, 1984. After living in the United States Virgin Islands for 20 years, Steel relocated to Atlanta to live closer to her son and grandson. By 2014, Steel began acting in community theater at the  Frank Bailey Senior Center in Riverdale, and soon began to receive roles in locally-made films. Steel died at her home in her native Detroit on October 15, 2021, at the age of 95.

Filmography

References

External links

1926 births
2021 deaths
21st-century American actresses
Actresses from Detroit
African-American actresses
20th-century African-American people
21st-century African-American people
20th-century African-American women
21st-century African-American women

Internal Revenue Service people